Fremont County School District #25 is a public school district based in Riverton, Wyoming, United States.

Geography
Fremont County School District #25 serves east central Fremont County, including the following communities:

Incorporated places
City of Riverton
Census-designated places (Note: All census-designated places are unincorporated.)
Arapahoe (partial)

Schools

High school
Grades 9-12
Riverton High School
Frontier Academy

Middle school
Grades 6-8
Riverton Middle School

Elementary schools
Grades 4-5
Rendezvous Elementary School
Grades 1-3
Ashgrove Elementary School
Jackson Elementary School
Willow Creek Elementary
PreK-K
Aspen Early Learning Center

Student demographics
The following figures are as of October 1, 2009.

Total District Enrollment: 2,466
Student enrollment by gender
Male: 1,272 (51.58%)
Female: 1,194 (48.42%)
Student enrollment by ethnicity
American Indian or Alaska Native: 357 (14.48%)
Asian: 17 (0.69%)
Black or African American: 29 (1.18%)
Hispanic or Latino: 170 (6.89%)
White: 1,893 (76.76%)

See also
List of school districts in Wyoming

References

External links
Fremont County School District #25 – official site.

Education in Fremont County, Wyoming
School districts in Wyoming
Riverton, Wyoming